was a freestyle swimmer from Japan. He competed in the 1952 Summer Olympics in Helsinki, Finland, and earned a silver medal in the 4 × 200 m freestyle relay team with teammates Toru Goto, Hiroshi Suzuki and Yoshihiro Hamaguchi.

References
 databaseOlympics

External links
 

Swimmers at the 1952 Summer Olympics
Olympic swimmers of Japan
1932 births
Possibly living people
Japanese male freestyle swimmers
Asian Games medalists in swimming
Swimmers at the 1954 Asian Games
Medalists at the 1952 Summer Olympics
Olympic silver medalists for Japan
Olympic silver medalists in swimming
Asian Games gold medalists for Japan
Asian Games silver medalists for Japan
Medalists at the 1954 Asian Games
20th-century Japanese people